The 60th Regiment Illinois Volunteer Infantry was an infantry regiment that served in the Union Army during the American Civil War.

Overview
Organized at Camp Dubois, Anna, Ill., and mustered in February 17, 1862. Moved to Cairo, Ill., February 22, 1862, thence to Island No. 10, Mississippi River, March 14. Attached to District of Cairo to March, 1862. 2nd Brigade, 1st Division, Army of Mississippi, to September, 1862. 2nd Brigade, 13th Division, Army of the Ohio, to November, 1862. 1st Brigade, 4th Division, Centre 14th Army Corps, Army of the Cumberland, to January, 1863. 1st Brigade, 4th Division, 14th Army Corps, to June, 1863. 1st Brigade, 2nd Division, Reserve Corps, Army of the Cumberland, to October, 1863. 1st Brigade, 2nd Division, 14th Army Corps, to July, 1865.

Service
Operations against Island Number 10, Mississippi River, March 14-April 8. Return to Columbus, Ky., and Cairo, Ill., thence moved to Hamburg Landing, Tenn., May 7–12. Advance on and siege of Corinth, Miss., May 12–30. Pursuit to Booneville May 31-June 12. At Clear Creek till July. March to Tuscumbia, Ala., July 20–25, thence to Nashville, Tenn., August 28-September 15. Action at Columbia September 10. Siege of Nashville September 15-November 6. Repulse of Forrest's attack on Edgefield November 5. Duty at Nashville, Tenn., till July 20, 1863. Skirmish at Edgefield November 7, 1862. Skirmish near Nashville January 3, 1863. Moved to Murfreesboro, Tenn., July 20, thence march to Columbia, Athens, Huntsville and Stevenson, Ala., August 24-September 7, and to Bridgeport, Ala., September 12. Duty there till October 1. Operations up the Sequatchie Valley against Wheeler October 1–17. Anderson's Cross Roads October 2 (Detachment). Moved to Waldron's Ridge, thence to Kelly's Ferry and guard lines of transportation till January 1864. Chattanooga-Ringgold Campaign November 23–27, 1863. Chickamauga Station November 26. March to relief of Knoxville, Tenn., November 28-December 24. At Rossville, Ga., till May 1864. Demonstration on Dalton, Ga., February 22–27, 1864. Tunnel Hill, Buzzard's Roost, and Rocky Faced Ridge February 23–25. Atlanta (Ga.) Campaign May 1-September 8. Near Tunnel Hill May 5. Tunnel Hill May 6–7. Demonstration on Rocky Faced Ridge May 8–11. Buzzard's Roost Gap May 8–9. Battle of Resaca May 14–15. Rome May 17–18. Operations on line of Pumpkin Vine Creek and battles about Dallas, New Hope Church, and Allatoona Hills May 25-June 5. Operations about Marietta and against Kenesaw Mountain June 10-July 2. Pine Hill June 11–14. Lost Mountain June 15–17. Assault on Kenesaw June 27. Ruff's or Vining Station July 4. Chattahoochie River July 5–17. Peach Tree Creek July 19–20. Siege of Atlanta July 22-August 25. Utoy Creek August 5–7. Flank movement on Jonesboro August 25–30. Battle of Jonesboro August 31-September 1. Lovejoy Station September 2–6. Operations in North Georgia and North Alabama against Forest and Hood September 29-November 3. Florence, Ala., October 6–7. March to the sea November 15-December 10. Siege of Savannah December 10–21. Campaign of the Carolinas January to April 1865. Fayetteville, N.C., March 13. Averysboro, Taylor's Hole Creek, March 16. Battle of Bentonville March 19–21. Occupation of Goldsboro March 24. Advance on Raleigh April 10–14. Occupation of Raleigh April 14. Bennett's House April 26. Surrender of Johnston and his army. March to Washington, D. C., via Richmond, Va., April 29-May 19. Grand Review May 24. Moved to Louisville, Ky., on June 12. Provost guard at headquarters 14th Army Corps till July 31. Mustered out July 31, 1865.

Companies
Company A - Union County,
Company B - Union County,
Company C - Jefferson and Washington counties,
Company D - Hamilton and Jefferson counties,
Company E - Williamson County,
Company F - Richland and Union counties,
Company G - Hamilton, Jefferson, Wayne counties,
Company H - Pope, Johnson and Wayne counties,
Company I - Jefferson County,
Company K - Johnson County,
Unassigned Recruits

Total strength and casualties
The regiment consisted of 2,877 men in 10 companies. The regiment suffered 2 officers and 44 enlisted men who were killed in action or mortally wounded and 4 officers and 225 enlisted men who died of disease, for a total of 275 fatalities.

Commanders
 Colonel Silas C. Toler -  died on March 2, 1863.
 Colonel William B. Anderson - resigned on December 26, 1864.
 Lieutenant Colonel George W. Evans - mustered out with the regiment.

See also
 List of Illinois Civil War Units
 Illinois in the American Civil War

Notes

References
 Eicher, John H., and David J. Eicher, Civil War High Commands. Stanford: Stanford University Press, 2001. .
 The Civil War Archive

Units and formations of the Union Army from Illinois
1862 establishments in Illinois
Military units and formations established in 1862
Military units and formations disestablished in 1865